King Buyelekhaya Zwelinbanzi Dalindyebo KaSabata (born 5 April 1964), salutation name Zwelibanzi, is currently the king of abaThembu people of South Africa since the late 1980s to present day . Dalindyebo is the son of the previous king of AbaThembu Kingdom, King Sabata Jonguhlanga Dalindyebo, he is a direct descendant of King Dhlomu KaNxeko who founded the AmaDlomo dynasty, and currently the ruler of bakwaDalindyebo lineage.

Anti Apartheid Activist
King Buyelekhaya Dalindyebo is a trained Mkhonto we Sizwe Member he went to exile at a very young age and was trained by people like Chris Hani, his commander was Ronnie Matshaya.

He trained in countries like Zambia and grew under Former Zambian President Kenneth kaunda, in life of exile King Dalndyebo also had  a privilege of being closer to Lesotho King and Swaziland King, He is the only King currently who is a trained MK soldier groomed in exile in Zambia.

The young Prince Buyelekhaya Dalindyebo at that time was forced into exile in 1974, followed by his father, King Sabata Dalindyebo, in 1980. King Sabata passed away in exile in Zambia in 1986,King Buyelekhaya Dalindyebo returned to South Africa as a 26-year-old in 1989 and was restored as the King of the AbaThembu after years of interference in royal and traditional affairs by the apartheid government during which Kaiser Matanzima, who ranked only as a senior Thembu chief and who took advantage of the Bantu Authorities system, was declared “Paramount Chief”. The appointment of Matanzima – who later became the leader of the “homeland” of Transkei – to the position of Paramount Chief created deep divisions among the AbaThembu.

Controversies
In May 2005, Dalindyebo was indicted for fraud, murder, attempted murder, kidnapping, and arson at the Mthatha High Court, and was subsequently convicted. In 2013, while he was appealing, the Democratic Alliance of South Africa recruited Dalindyebo into the party. It is surmised that he was chosen because he could bring votes to the DA in the Eastern Cape province.

In July 2014, a group of Thembu chiefs wrote to President of South Africa Jacob Zuma requesting that Dalindyebo be removed, claiming he was an "evil king" and "not fit to rule".

In October 2015, Dalindyebo was sentenced to 12 years in prison, and his membership in the DA was terminated. In December 2015, as Dalindyebo was due to start serving his sentence, he made last-minute efforts to avoid incarceration by petitioning Zuma for a presidential pardon. The petition was dismissed at the end of December, and he was incarcerated on 30 December 2015. A second bid for a presidential pardon was apparently launched in early 2016. In January 2016 there were reports that Dalindyebo had been on a hunger strike. Dalindyebo spent much of his first couple of months of imprisonment in the hospital.

On 23 December 2019, following president Cyril Ramaphosa's Day of Reconciliation speech, Dalindyebo was released from prison after serving a third of his sentence.

On 13 March 2020, Dalindyebo was arrested for assault. According to reports in local newspapers, the king arrived at the royal residence, the Great Place, at 2 a.m. on the morning of 13 March carrying an axe. He then allegedly proceeded to attack the current acting king, Azenathi, and his wife, who was later hospitalised. In an attempt to escape, Azenathi reportedly jumped out of the window of the palace.

In the runup to the 2021 South African municipal elections, Dalindyebo received a cow and was promised a Mercedes-Benz SUV by the Economic Freedom Fighters, after which he announced his support for the party and called on the nation to do the same.

References

1964 births
Living people
People from the Eastern Cape
Xhosa people
Monarchies of South Africa